Owen v. City of Independence, 445 U.S. 622 (1980), was a case decided by the United States Supreme Court, in which the court held that a municipality has no immunity from liability under Section 1983 flowing from its constitutional violations and may not assert the good faith of its officers as a defense to such liability.

Background 
The city council voted to fire the city's chief of police and in doing so, violated his procedural due process rights to a pre-termination hearing.  Plaintiff named the city and city council in the suit.

Opinion of the Court 
In an opinion written by Justice Brennan, the Court held that a municipality has no immunity from liability under Section 1983 flowing from its constitutional violations and may not assert the good faith of its officers as a defense to such liability.

External links
 

United States Supreme Court cases
Second Enforcement Act of 1871 case law
1980 in United States case law
Independence, Missouri
United States Supreme Court cases of the Burger Court